Lyndon John "Lyn" Davis (22 December 1943 – 27 June 2008) was a New Zealand rugby union player. A halfback, Davis represented Canterbury at a provincial level, and was a member of the New Zealand national side, the All Blacks, from 1976 to 1977. He played 16 matches for the All Blacks including three internationals.

References

1943 births
2008 deaths
Rugby union players from Christchurch
People educated at Cashmere High School
New Zealand rugby union players
New Zealand international rugby union players
Canterbury rugby union players
Rugby union scrum-halves